Jacqueline Porel (1918–2012) was a French stage and film actress. She was also a voice actor, dubbing foreign films for release in French-speaking markets. She was married to the actor Gérard Landry.

Selected filmography
 Le héros de la Marne (1938)
 Romance of Paris (1941)
 La Grande Meute (1945)
 Third at Heart (1947)
 My Friend Sainfoin (1950)
 Le 84 prend des vacances (1950)
 The Call of Destiny (1953)
 The Drunkard (1953)
 Tourments (1954)
 Razzia sur la chnouf (1955)
 Captain Blood (1960)
 Love and the Frenchwoman (1960) 
 Love on a Pillow (1962)
 Germinal (1963)
 Anatomy of a Marriage (1964)
 Promise at Dawn (1970)

References

Bibliography
 Edwards, Paul M. . World War I on Film: English Language Releases through 2014. McFarland, 2016.

External links

1918 births
2012 deaths
French film actresses
French stage actresses
People from Ain